The Yayasan Negeri Sembilan HC, are the Malaysia Hockey League (MHL) team from Seremban, Negeri Sembilan, Malaysia. The team is led by  Nasir Ahmed, a member of ex-Pakistan national field hockey team. Yayasan Negeri Sembilan also the club can be the giants of Malaysia Hockey League because many good import players come from this club such as Shakeel Abassi, Muhammad Waqas.

Yayasan Negeri Sembilan HC is a successful team in Malaysia Hockey League. They won the title league twice in the seasons 1994-1995 and also 1995-1996.

Players

First team

Former players

   Pargat Singh
   Jude Felix
   N. Mukesh Kumar
   Sarjit Singh
   Soon Mustapha
   Gurmit Singh
   Stephen van Huizen
  Mirnawan Nawawi
  Norhamezi Omar

Club officials

Coaching and medical staff
 Manager:  P. Tamilselvan
 Chief coach:   Rajan Krishnan
 Physiotherapist:  Prem Ghanesh Chandra Segeran

Chief coach history

Honours
 Malaysia Hockey League titles         : 2 (1994-1995 & 1995-1996)
 MHL-TNB Cup/Overall Champions Titles   : 2 (1994 & 1995)

See also
 Malaysia Hockey League

References
 YNS targets a top-four finish - The Star Nov. 30, 2010

External links
 Yayasan Negeri Sembilan HC's page in TNBMHL.com.my website

Malaysian field hockey clubs
Field hockey clubs established in 1987
1987 establishments in Malaysia